Bruce Bursford (29 April 1958 – 9 February 2000) was a British sportsman from Dereham, Norfolk who broke the record for the fastest speed on a bicycle on a treadmill at 334.6 km/h in 1995. He designed the bicycles Ultimate and Millennium.

History 
Bruce Bursford was a schoolboy cycling champion and claimed nine speed records.

The idea for a bicycle to be made using the advanced materials and techniques usually found in aerospace and Formula 1 came from Bursford himself. In 1995 he achieved 334.6 km/h breaking the record by 88 km/h on a rolling road in the Malcolm Campbell building at Brooklands Museum in Surrey, England. To achieve the speed, conditions were simulated whereby Burford was "towed" until he reached . The towline was then "released", and he was left to pedal.

Bursford's speed was attained during a half-minute interval with him reaching  in two seconds at the start of the attempt. This feat was achieved on his specially-built bike called the Millennium Cycle. The record-breaking machine used silica tyres filled with helium and ceramic bearings designed to revolve with minimum friction.

Bursford's 'Ultimate' bike won him a Millennium Product Award.

Uri Geller helped him train his mind during record bids.

Bursford died in a collision with a truck while training on the A47 at Easton near his home in Dereham, Norfolk.

See also 
Fastest speed on a bicycle

References

British male cyclists
1958 births
2000 deaths
Place of birth missing